Madina Zafar (born 10 August 1998) is a Pakistani professional squash player. As of August 2018 she is ranked 97 in  the world, her career-high PSA world ranking. Her elder sister Faiza Zafar is also a fellow squash player who represents Pakistan internationally.

Career 
Zafar was selected to represent Pakistan at the 2018 Commonwealth Games along with her sister where both of them made their Commonwealth Games debut appearances. Madina partnered Faiza Zafar in the women's doubles event during the 2018 Commonwealth Games and were eliminated from the group stage.

Zafar took part in the 2018 PSF Pakistan Squash Circuit I event as a part of 2018 PSA World Tour and emerged as runner-up to her sister, Faiza.

References

External links 
 

1998 births
Living people
Pakistani female squash players
Commonwealth Games competitors for Pakistan
Squash players at the 2018 Commonwealth Games
Asian Games competitors for Pakistan
Squash players at the 2018 Asian Games
South Asian Games silver medalists for Pakistan
South Asian Games bronze medalists for Pakistan
Sportspeople from Gujranwala
South Asian Games medalists in squash